WJCR-LP (94.7 FM) is a radio station licensed to Jasper, Tennessee, United States. The station is currently owned by Jasper Christ-Centered Radio, Inc.

References

External links
 

JCR-LP
JCR-LP